Serge Tatiefang (also known as El Tati), (born 25 August 1987) is a Cameroonian defensive midfielder, He currently plays for Skonto FC in Virsliga.

Career
He has played in international leagues like Russian First Division,  Primera División de México{{}} and Latvian Higher League.

Tatiefang signed with Mexican club Estudiantes Tecos following a spell with FC SKA-Energiya Khabarovsk. He played for the club in the 2008 promotion playoffs.

References

External links
Profile at KLISF

Living people
Cameroonian footballers
FK Ventspils players
Expatriate footballers in Latvia
1987 births
Association football defenders
FC SKA-Khabarovsk players